Ośno  is a village in the administrative district of Gmina Kwidzyn, within Kwidzyn County, Pomeranian Voivodeship, in northern Poland.

The village has a population of 290.

References

Villages in Kwidzyn County